500 Days of Summer (stylized as (500) Days of Summer) is a 2009 American romantic comedy-drama film directed by Marc Webb from a screenplay written by Scott Neustadter and Michael H. Weber, and produced by Mark Waters. The film stars Joseph Gordon-Levitt and Zooey Deschanel and employs a nonlinear narrative structure, with the story based upon its male protagonist and his memories of a failed relationship.

As an independent production, the film was picked up for distribution by Fox Searchlight Pictures and premiered at the 25th Sundance Film Festival. It received positive critical reviews and became a successful "sleeper hit", earning over $60 million in worldwide returns, far exceeding its $7.5 million budget. Many critics lauded the film as one of the best from 2009 and drew comparisons to other acclaimed films such as Annie Hall (1977) and High Fidelity (2000).

The film received Best Original Screenplay and Best Screenplay awards at the 14th Satellite Awards and 25th Independent Spirit Awards, respectively, as well as two nominations at the 67th Golden Globe Awards: Best Motion Picture – Musical or Comedy and Best Actor – Musical or Comedy (Gordon-Levitt).

Plot 

Tom Hansen is an aspiring architect who works as a writer at a greeting card company. On January 8, he meets Summer Finn, a new employee. They discover that they have a similar taste in music. Later, at a karaoke night for their work, they talk about love. Tom believes in it, but Summer does not. Tom's friend and co-worker McKenzie drunkenly reveals that Tom likes Summer, which he asserts is only "as friends", something Summer agrees with. A few days later, Summer spontaneously kisses Tom in the office. Summer is not looking for a serious relationship. Tom agrees to a casual relationship. That night they have sex; Tom is elated.

After several months of dating, they grow closer. Both Tom's friends and his preteen half-sister Rachel push him to ask Summer where they are in their relationship, though Summer brushes this off, saying that it should not matter if they are both happy. One night, Tom gets into a fight with a man who tries to pick Summer up in a bar, causing their first argument. Later, Summer visits Tom; they make up. Tom asks about their relationship, wanting consistency. Summer says she cannot promise him how she would feel in the future. To show him how she currently feels, she kisses him; they spend the night together.

After meeting at a café, Tom wants to go back to Summer's, but she insists on seeing The Graduate. She weeps at the ending, surprising him, as he had always thought it was a romantic fairy tale. Later, at the record store, Summer is distracted, and kisses him good night on the cheek. Tom brings her to a diner, where she lightly announces the relationship is not working, and breaks up with him. Although she still considers Tom her best friend, he is horrified and becomes depressed.

Summer quits the greeting card company. Tom's boss moves him to the consolations department, as his depression is making him unsuitable for happier events. Tom goes on a blind date with a woman named Alison. Tom spends the date talking about Summer until Alison leaves exasperated.

Months later, Tom attends co-worker Millie's wedding and tries to avoid Summer on the train, but she spots him and invites him for coffee. They have a good time at the wedding, dance together, and Summer catches the bouquet. She invites Tom to a party at her apartment, falling asleep on his shoulder on the ride back. He attends the party, hoping to rekindle their relationship, but barely interacts with Summer, spending most of the night drinking alone, until he spots her engagement ring.

Tom leaves devastated. Further depressed, he only leaves his apartment for alcohol and junk food. After a few days, he returns to work hung over and, after an emotional outburst, quits. Rachel tells Tom that she does not believe Summer was "the one" and that he is only remembering happy memories of the relationship. Tom thinks harder, finally seeing moments of incompatibilities he overlooked, and warning signs he missed on the day of the breakup. One day, Tom finds the energy to get out of bed and rededicates himself to architecture, as Summer had encouraged him to do. He assembles a portfolio and secures job interviews.

Summer visits Tom at his favorite spot in the city. He tells her he left the office, and notes that she got married, which he cannot comprehend as she never wanted to be someone's girlfriend. Summer says she got married because she felt sure, which she did not with Tom. When he says he was wrong about true love existing, she counters that he was right about it, just wrong about it being with her. She tells him she is glad he is doing well. Tom wishes her happiness.

On Wednesday, May 23, Tom meets a woman applying for the same job. He finds she shares his favorite spot and invites her for coffee afterwards. She politely declines, then changes her mind. She reveals her name as Autumn. The day counter then resets to Day 1, becoming brighter than it ever did during the Days of Summer.

Cast

Production

Writing 
The film is presented as a non-linear narrative. Each scene is introduced using a title card showing which of the 500 days it is. Co-writer of the film Scott Neustadter admitted the film was based on a real romance. Neustadter explains that when he met the real girl who inspired the character Summer as a student at the London School of Economics in 2002, he was rebounding from a bad breakup back home, and promptly fell "crazily, madly, hopelessly in love" with the girl who "returned his kisses but not his ardor." The ending of the relationship was "painfully and unforgettably awful," which prompted him to co-write the film with Michael H. Weber. When Neustadter later showed the script to Summer's real-life counterpart, she said she related more to the Tom character. Weber also stated that, "we've all been in the trenches of love, we've all gone through the highs and lows, so Scott and I felt that the only way to tell this story was to come at it from a completely real place. It was pretty interesting for us because Scott was just going through a break-up and I was in a long-term relationship, so we each brought a totally opposite perspective, living it and not living it, and I think that tension helped to bring out more of the comedy".

Direction 
Director Marc Webb has described the film as more of a "coming of age" story as opposed to a "rom-com". He stated, "We arrive at a different conclusion, for one thing. Plus, most romantic comedies are more loyal to a formula than to emotional truth. It's about happiness, and learning that you'll find it within yourself, rather than in the big blue eyes of the girl in the cubicle down the hall. I wanted to make an unsentimental movie and an uncynical movie. In my mind, I wanted it to be something you could dance to. That's why we put a parenthesis in the title – it's like a pop song in movie form. It's not a big film. It's not about war or poverty. It's about 500 days in a young guy's relationship, but it's no less deserving of scrutiny. When your heart is first broken, it consumes you. And it's an emotion I wanted to make a movie about, before I forgot how it felt".
Webb also stated that Deschanel's character, Summer, is based on a stock character type; "Yes, Summer is an immature view of a woman. She's Tom's view of a woman. He doesn't see her complexity and the consequence for him is heartbreak. In Tom's eyes, Summer is perfection, but perfection has no depth. Summer's not a girl, she's a phase." Gordon-Levitt explained that he was drawn to the role of Tom because of his relatability to the character. "I've had my heart broken before. Truly, truly broken. But when I look back at me in my heartbroken phase, it's pretty hilarious, because it felt so much more extreme than it really was. One of the things I love about 500 Days of Summer is that it doesn't make light of what we go through in romances, but it is honest about it and shows it for what it is, which is often profoundly funny".

Filming locations 

David Ng of the Los Angeles Times describes architecture as a star of the film.
Tom is seen reading Alain de Botton's The Architecture of Happiness.
The film was originally set in San Francisco but was later moved to Los Angeles and the script rewritten to make better use of the location. Buildings used include the Los Angeles Music Center (which includes the Dorothy Chandler Pavilion) and the towers of California Plaza.
The older Fine Arts Building is featured in the film, in a scene where Tom shows it to Summer and mentions its designers, Walker and Eisen, two of his favorite architects.

Christopher Hawthorne of the Los Angeles Times describes the film as having "finely honed sense of taste" to include the Bradbury Building where Tom goes for his job interview.

Tom's favorite spot in Los Angeles was shot at Angel's Knoll, which became a popular tourist attraction after the film's release. Since July 2013 it has been closed off to the public due to state cutbacks. In his article about cinematic cartography, Dr. Chris Lukinbeal suggests that the location of Angel's Knoll mirrors Tom's view of the world. He argues that Tom only perceives the beauty of the buildings surrounding them and only acknowledges the parking lot when Summer points it out to him. He states that “Tom is also unable to see beyond his expectations of hopeless romance.”

Costume design 
Costume designer, Hope Hanafin has revealed through interviews that Marc Webb insisted on the color blue being worn exclusively by Summer. He based his decision on Zooey Deschanel's eye color, but as Hanafin disclosed, it works on a subconscious level as well, attracting attention at all times. The only scene to break this "rule" is the Hall & Oates dance sequence where many of the extras appear in blue. "The point of that was to show that, in his morning-after glow, Tom's whole world is a reflection of Summer". The costumes are a mixture of vintage and fast fashion with the emphasis on staying realistic to what the characters could afford. Summer's wardrobe is refreshing and stylish without anything tying it to the years around the film's release which gives the aesthetics a timeless quality.

Soundtrack 

Two soundtrack albums were released for 500 Days of Summer. The first, consisting of various pop songs from the film, was released through Sire Records and reached no. 42 on the Billboard 200 sales chart. Andrew Leahey of Allmusic rated the album three and a half stars out of five, saying "With music playing such an integral role in the story line, it's refreshing to see that the accompanying soundtrack does its job well, distilling the characters' record collections (not to mention the movie's quirky, nostalgic ambiance) into one eclectic track list." The second album consists of the film's musical score, composed by Mychael Danna and Rob Simonsen.

Marketing 
To help promote the film, Gordon-Levitt and Deschanel starred in the debut episode of Microsoft Zune and Mean Magazines "Cinemash" series. In the episode, they "mash" the characters from the film Sid and Nancy with story elements from 500 Days of Summer.

Marc Webb created a music video as a companion piece to the film, titled "The Bank Heist". It features Deschanel and Gordon-Levitt dancing to "Why Do You Let Me Stay Here?", a song by Deschanel's folk group She & Him. Webb remarked, "when we didn't include Zooey in the dance sequence [in 500 Days], she was a little heartbroken and I felt like I needed to remedy that."

Release 

The film made its debut at the 25th Sundance Film Festival. It proved a huge success and received a standing ovation from festival crowds upon screening. In Europe, 500 Days of Summer premiered in Switzerland as the opening film of the 62nd Locarno Film Festival.

Filmed independently, it was picked up for distribution by Fox Searchlight Pictures and opened in the United States and Canada on July 17, 2009, later expanding to wide release on August 7, 2009. It was later also released on September 2, 2009, in Ireland and the United Kingdom, and opened in Australia on September 17, 2009.

Box office 
Upon the film's initial limited release in the U.S, it was expected to become the "breakout indie hit of the summer". 
By September 8, the film had taken in $1.9 million from 318 screens in the United Kingdom. This was regarded as a successful five-day opening by Fox Searchlight, earning around half as much as the science-fiction blockbuster District 9, which took in $3.5 million.
The film ended up grossing $32.4 million in the United States and Canada and $60.7 million worldwide.

Reception

Critical response 
On Rotten Tomatoes, the film has an approval rating of 85% based on 236 reviews, with an average rating of 7.6/10. The site's critical consensus reads, "A clever, offbeat romantic comedy, 500 Days of Summer is refreshingly honest and utterly charming." At the website's year-end "Golden Tomato Awards", which honored the best reviewed films of 2009, the film placed second in the romantic category. On Metacritic, the film has a weighted average score of 76 out of 100 based on 36 critics, indicating "generally favorable reviews".

Roger Ebert of the Chicago Sun-Times gave the film four stars out of four, describing the film as "a delightful comedy, alive with invention". He particularly praised the strong performances of Gordon-Levitt and Deschanel and summarized his review by adding, "Here is a rare movie that begins by telling us how it will end and is about how the hero has no idea why". Premiere also awarded the film four stars out of four, stating "Much like the actual summer (the season, not the character), we never wanted it to end".
Michael Ordoña of the Los Angeles Times gave a positive review. He wrote, "500 Days of Summer is something seldom seen: an original romantic comedy. It bristles with energy, emotion and intellect, as it flits about the dizzying highs and weeping-karaoke lows of a passionate entanglement".
Dana Stevens of Slate also praised the film and described it as "a keeper. It's fun both to watch and to talk about afterward, and it possesses the elusive rom-com sine qua non: two equally appealing leads who bounce wonderfully off each other".

Lou Lumenick of the New York Post awarded the film three stars out of four. He praised the directing of Marc Webb, stating, "it's the oldest bittersweet story in the book, of course, but music-video director Marc Webb approaches his feature debut with great confidence, flair and a minimum of schmaltz. That's the whole guy-centric point of 500 Days of Summer, though. Sometimes you never, ever truly figure out why these mysterious creatures break your heart". Entertainment Weekly critic Owen Gleiberman gave the film an "A", and also praised the originality of the story; "Most romantic comedies have half a dozen situations at best: Meet Cute, Infatuation, Pop Song Montage, Contrived Mix-Up, Angry Breakup, and Final Clinch. 500 Days of Summer is about the many unclassifiable moments in between. It's a feat of star acting, and it helps make 500 Days not just bitter or sweet but everything in between". Film Threat critic Scott Knopf gave the film a maximum five-star rating and called the script "fantastic". He also lauded the film's innovative nature; "Of course they meet. Of course they fall for each other. Of course there are problems. It sounds cliché but what's remarkable about 500 Days is how the film explores new ways to tell the world's oldest story". He concluded that the film was "the best romantic comedy since Love Actually." Peter Travers of Rolling Stone gave the film three and a half stars out of four. He wrote, "Boy meets girl, boy loses girl. It's been done to emo death. That's why the sublimely smart-sexy-joyful-sad 500 Days of Summer hits you like a blast of pure romantic oxygen" and concludes: "500 Days is otherwise a different kind of love story: an honest one that takes a piece out of you". USA Today's Claudia Puig wrote: "Much like Annie Hall did for a previous generation, (500) Days of Summer may be the movie that best captures a contemporary romantic sensibility." IGN critic Eric Goldman gave the film 9 out of 10, and praised the film as "one of the best of 2009" and particularly complimented the innovative nature of the story in an often clichéd genre; "500 Days of Summer proved there is a way to bring something fresh and new to one of the most cliché and often frustrating genres – the romantic comedy". A.O. Scott of The New York Times gave the film 4 out of 5 and called it "Slight, charming and refreshingly candid little picture."

Scott Tobias of The A.V. Club graded the film B−, but criticized it for its "dispiriting clichés," which make it "wind up in a no-man's land between Hollywood and something real." NPR was more dismissive: "For all its rhetorical whimsy and hipster dressings, 500 Days of Summer is a thoroughly conservative affair, as culturally and romantically status quo as any Jennifer Aniston vehicle." Joe Morgenstern of The Wall Street Journal was also more critical, calling it, "synthetic and derivative, a movie that's popping with perceptions while searching for a style."

British newspaper The Times gave a mixed review. Despite Toby Young awarding the film three stars out of five, he critiqued, "It is hardly the freshest romantic comedy of past 20 years. Taking the best bits from other movies and rearranging them in a non-linear sequence does not make for an original film." The Guardian film critic Peter Bradshaw said the film was "let down by sitcom cliches, and by being weirdly incurious about the inner life of its female lead."

Mark Adams of the Daily Mirror, though, gave the film a glowing review, awarding it a full five stars, and writing, "It is a modern romance for grown-ups... a sweet-natured, funny, deeply-romantic tale that brims with energy and is blessed with top-notch performances by Deschanel and Gordon-Levitt, who are both charming and have real chemistry". Empire gave the film 4 out of 5 stars, and wrote: "Perfectly played, simultaneously serious and light, endlessly inventive, this is a strong contender for the most original date movie of the year."

Top Ten lists

The film was also included in several "Top Ten" year-end lists for 2009 by various film critics.

Cultural impact 
In the Entertainment Weekly's interview of the 10th anniversary of the film's release, the lead actors, Joseph Gordon-Levitt and Zooey Deschanel, addressed its cultural impact and the viewers' frequent misconception of their characters, such as thinking Summer is a villain. Even though the film is told from Tom's point of view, "Summer is completely honest the entire movie." Gordon-Levitt repeatedly warned against sympathizing with his character Tom, who "develops a mildly delusional obsession over a girl onto whom he projects all these fantasies [...] That's falling in love with the idea of a person, not the actual person."

Accolades 
Scott Neustadter and Michael H. Weber received numerous awards for their screenplay; including the 2009 Hollywood Film Festival's Hollywood Breakthrough Screenwriter Award on October 26, 2009, the Satellite Award for Best Original Screenplay, the Southeastern Film Critics Association Award for Best Original Screenplay (with the film also being named in the Top Ten Films of the Year), as well as the Las Vegas Film Critics Society Award for Best Screenplay.

Alan Edward Bell won the San Diego Film Critics Society Award for Best Editing, as well as the film being named one of the ten best movies of the year by the National Board of Review Awards 2009.
The film also received two nominations at the 67th Golden Globe Awards announced on December 15, 2009, for Best Motion Picture – Musical or Comedy and for Joseph Gordon-Levitt for Best Actor – Musical or Comedy. It has been nominated for four Independent Spirit Awards and won the award for Best Screenplay.

References

External links 

 Archived of 
 
 
 

2009 films
2000s coming-of-age comedy-drama films
2009 independent films
2009 romantic comedy-drama films
American coming-of-age comedy-drama films
American films with live action and animation
American independent films
American romantic comedy-drama films
Films directed by Marc Webb
Fiction with unreliable narrators
Films produced by Mason Novick
Films scored by Mychael Danna
Films scored by Rob Simonsen
Films set in Los Angeles
Films shot in Los Angeles
Fox Searchlight Pictures films
Dune Entertainment films
American nonlinear narrative films
Films with screenplays by Scott Neustadter and Michael H. Weber
Films about depression
Fiction about origami
2009 directorial debut films
2000s English-language films
2000s American films